Elizabeth Olatayo Williams (born June 23, 1993) is a British-born Nigerian-American basketball player for the Chicago Sky of the Women's National Basketball Association (WNBA). She was the longest standing member of the Atlanta Dream until she signed with the Mystics. After immigrating from Colchester, Essex, England, she played her college career at Duke University. Then, she was drafted by the Connecticut Sun 4th overall in the 2015 WNBA Draft, and was traded to Atlanta after only one year with the Sun.

USA Basketball career

2009 U16 Mexico City
Williams was selected to be a member of the first ever U16 team for USA Basketball. The team competed in the First FIBA Americas U16 Championship For Women held in Mexico City, Mexico in August 2009. She led the team leader in rebounds, with 5.2 per game, and averaged 13.4 points per game, second highest on the team. She tied Breanna Stewart for the most number of blocks per game, recording 7 per game. She helped the team to a 5–0 record and the gold medal at the competition. The win secured an automatic bid to the 2010 FIBA U17 World Championship. Williams was named the Most Valuable Player in the Championship.

2010 U17 France
Williams continued with the team as it became the U17 team. The team competed in the 2010 FIBA U17 World Championship for Women, held in Rodez & Toulouse, France during July 2010. Williams helped the team win the gold medal and an 8–0 record. She was the leading scorer, averaging 13.5 points per game and hit 61.8% of her shots, highest on the team and second highest among all participants. She led the team in rebounds, averaging 7.6 per game. She recorded 16 blocks, second highest on the team. Williams started strong, recording a double-double in the opening game against France, and again, with 20 points and 14 rebounds in the second game against Russia.

U19 World Championships Chile
In 2011, Williams was selected to be on the USA basketball U19 team at the U19 World Championship, held in Puerto Montt, Chile.The USA won their first five games, but then came up short, losing to Canada 64–52. They were still qualified for the medal round, and played France in the quarterfinal. The USA was down by as much as 13 points early in the game, but took a lead with just over a minute to go in the game and ended up with the win 70–64. The USA took an early lead in the semi-final against Brazil, and went on to win to qualify for the gold medal game. The final game was against Spain. Williams was one of three USA players with 15 points in the game, along with Stefanie Dolson and Kaleena Mosqueda-Lewis who helped the USA win the gold medal 69–46. Williams averaged 8.9 points per game and 5.0 rebounds per game to help the US to an 8–1 record and the gold medal in the Championship game.

College career
Williams played at Duke for four seasons. During her last year she averaged 14.5 points, 9.0 rebounds, and 2.5 assists per game. Her assist average was the highest of any center in the country in the Atlantic Coast Conference women's basketball league. She ended her career with 426 total blocks, the ninth highest in NCAA history.

WNBA career

Connecticut Sun (2015)
Williams was drafted fourth overall by the Connecticut Sun in the 2015 WNBA draft. Her rookie season was her only season with the Sun, where she averaged 3.3 points, 2.3 rebounds, and 0.9 blocks per game.

Atlanta Dream (2016–2021)

She was traded to the Atlanta Dream for the 2016 WNBA season. For 2016, after experiencing increased per game averages of 11.9 points, 8.1 rebounds, and 2.3 blocks, she won the WNBA Most Improved Player Award.

Activism
Williams led a basketball driven campaign to force Atlanta team owner Senator Kelly Loeffler to renege on her comments about the Black Lives Matter movement. Williams was also a part of a campaign consisting of Atlanta Dream players to elect Loeffler's opponent, Raphael Warnock, the eventual winner of the 2020-21 special election for US senator of Georgia.

Washington Mystics (2022–present)
In an article for The Players' Tribune published on February 4, 2022, Williams detailed the circumstances and her rationales behind her decision to sign with the Washington Mystics for her eighth WNBA season.

Honors
 2015—WBCA All-America team
 2015—WBCA National Defensive Player of the Year
 2010—MVP USA Basketball FIBA Americas U16 Championship

Personal life
She was born in England to Nigerian parents. Williams' younger brother, Mark, played college basketball at Duke and was selected 15th overall by the Charlotte Hornets in the 2022 NBA draft.

Statistics

College career
Source

WNBA

Source

Regular season

|-
| style="text-align:left;"| 
| style="text-align:left;"| Connecticut
| 21 || 0 || 11.7 || .528 || .000 || .560 || 3.2 || 0.4 || 0.3 || 0.9 || 0.5 || 3.3
|-
| style="text-align:left;"| 
| style="text-align:left;"| Atlanta
| style="background:#D3D3D3"| 34° || style="background:#D3D3D3"|34° || style="background:#D3D3D3"|34.7° || .442 || .000 || .692 || 8.1 || 1.2 || 0.8 || 2.3 || 1.2 || 11.9
|-
| style="text-align:left;"| 
| style="text-align:left;"| Atlanta
| 34 || style="background:#D3D3D3"|34° || 31.4 || .485 || .000 || .659 || 7.2 || 1.4 || 1.1 || 2.0 || 1.4 || 10.4
|-
| style="text-align:left;"| 
| style="text-align:left;"| Atlanta
| 33 || 32 || 26.8 || .548 || .000 || .563 || 5.8 || 1.4 || 0.8 || 1.8 || 1.2 || 9.1
|-
| style="text-align:left;"| 
| style="text-align:left;"| Atlanta
| 32 || 32 || 28.4 || .455 || .000 || .732 || 6.5 || 1.2  || 0.8 || 1.7 || 1.3 || 9.3
|-
| style="text-align:left;"| 
| style="text-align:left;"| Atlanta
| style="background:#D3D3D3"| 22° || style="background:#D3D3D3"|22° || 29.2 || .489 || .000 || .742 || 5.7 || 1.4 || 0.8 || 1.4 || 1.1 || 10.1
|-
| style="text-align:left;"| 
| style="text-align:left;"| Atlanta
| style="background:#D3D3D3"| 32° || style="background:#D3D3D3"|32° || 23.8 || .516 || .000 || .509 || 4.9 || 1.2 || 1.1 || 1.3 || 0.8 || 5.8
|-
| style="text-align:left;"| 
| style="text-align:left;"| Washington
| | 30 || 0 || 14.9 || .482 || .000 || .581 || 3.8 || 0.5 || 0.6 || 0.7 || 0.6 || 5.4
|-
| style="text-align:left;"| Career
| style="text-align:left;"| 8 years, 3 teams
| 238 || 186 || 25.8 || .484 || .000 || .650 || 5.8 || 1.1 || 0.8 || 1.6 || 1.1 || 8.4

Playoffs

|-
|style="text-align:left;"|2016
|style="text-align:left;"|Atlanta
| 2 || 2 || 38.5 || .381 || .000 || .778 || 12.5 || 1.5 || 0.5 || 2.5 || 0.5 || 11.5
|-
|style="text-align:left;"|2018
|style="text-align:left;"|Atlanta
| 5 || 5 || 31.4 || .511 || .000 || .545 || 8.8 || 1.0 || 0.6 || 1.2 || 1.0 || 10.8
|-
|style="text-align:left;"|2022
|style="text-align:left;"|Washington
| 2 || 0 ||| 5.5 || 1.000 || .000 || .250 || 1.0 || 0.0 || 0.0 || 0.5 || 0.0 || 2.5
|- 
|style="text-align:left;"| Career
|style="text-align:left;"| 3 years, 2 team
| 9 || 7 || 27.2 || .486 || .000 || .583 || 7.9 || 0.9 || 0.4 || 1.3 || 0.7 || 9.1
|}

References

1993 births
Living people
All-American college women's basketball players
American expatriate basketball people in China
Atlanta Dream players
Basketball players from Virginia
Centers (basketball)
Connecticut Sun draft picks
Connecticut Sun players
Duke Blue Devils women's basketball players
Liaoning Flying Eagles players
McDonald's High School All-Americans
Parade High School All-Americans (girls' basketball)
Power forwards (basketball)
Sportspeople from Virginia Beach, Virginia
Princess Anne High School alumni
Fenerbahçe women's basketball players
Washington Mystics players
Women's National Basketball Association All-Stars